The Executives were an Australian pop music band, formed in 1966 and reformed in 1974, consisting of band members Ray Burton, Rhys Clark, Gino Cunico, Brian King, Carol King, Gary King, Keith Leslie and Brian Patterson. They are arguably best known for their top 40 singles "My Aim Is To Please You" (1967), "Sit Down, I Think I Love You" (1967) and "Windy Day" (1968) reaching No. 18, No. 20 and No. 24 respectively on the Australian charts.

The group later reformed in 1985 with the line up of Carol King and Jonne Sands on vocals, Jose McLaughlin (keyboards), Pip Lee (drums), Moz Sammons (guitar) and Wayne Newey (bass). This version of the group worked extensively throughout Australia before disbanding in 1986.

Dressed in Ned Kelly-style breastplates, they appeared on Skippy the Bush Kangaroo in the episode "The Bushrangers" in 1968.

Discography

Albums

Studio albums
The Executives (1968)
The Executives on Bandstand (1968)

Compilation albums
The Happening World of The Executives (1989)

Charting singles

EPs
"Break Out" (1967)
"It's a Happening World" (1968)
"Windy Day" (1968)
"Parenthesis" (1969)

References

External links

PopArchives.com.au: Windy Day, It's A Happening World, My Aim Is To Please You, Sit Down I Think I Love You

Australian pop music groups